The Maverick is a 1952 American Western film directed by Thomas Carr and starring Wild Bill Elliott, Myron Healey and Phyllis Coates.

Plot

Cast
 Wild Bill Elliott as Lieutenant Pete Devlin  
 Myron Healey as Sergeant Frick  
 Phyllis Coates as Della Watson  
 Richard Reeves as Frank Bullitt  
 Terry Frost as Trooper Westman  
 Rand Brooks as Trooper Barnham  
 Russell Hicks as Colonel Hook  
 Robert Bray as Corporal Johnson  
 Florence Lake as Grandma Watson  
 Gregg Barton as George Fane  
 Denver Pyle as Bud Karnes  
 Robert J. Wilke as Gang leader Massey  
 Gene Roth as Fred Nixon  
 Joel Allen as John Rowe

References

Bibliography
 Michael G. Fitzgerald & Boyd Magers. Ladies of the Western: Interviews with Fifty-One More Actresses from the Silent Era to the Television Westerns of the 1950s and 1960s. McFarland, 2006.

External links
 

1952 films
1952 Western (genre) films
American Western (genre) films
Films directed by Thomas Carr
Western (genre) cavalry films
Allied Artists films
Films scored by Raoul Kraushaar
American black-and-white films
1950s English-language films
1950s American films